Leopold Maria Mandić, OFMCap (also known as Leopold of Castelnuovo; 12 May 1866 – 30 July 1942) was a Croatian Capuchin friar and Catholic priest, who suffered from disabilities that would plague his speech and stature. He developed tremendous spiritual strength in spite of his disabilities and became extremely popular in his ministry as a confessor, often spending 12–15 hours in the confessional.

Although Mandić wanted to be a missionary in Eastern Europe, he spent almost all his adult life in Italy, living in Padua from 1906 until his death. He also spent one year in an Italian prison during World War I, since he would not renounce his Croatian nationality. He also dreamed unceasingly about reuniting the Catholic and Orthodox churches and going to the Orient. He became known as an Apostle of Confession and an Apostle of Unity. He made a famous prayer that is the forerunner of today's ecumenism.

Life

Early life
He was born Bogdan Ivan Mandić in the coastal town of Herceg Novi, in the Bay of Kotor, then in the Austrian Empire but today part of Montenegro. He was the twelfth child of Dragica Zarević and Petar Antun Mandić, owner of an Adriatic fishing fleet, natives of Zakučac (in the hinterland of the city of Omiš, 28 km from Split).

His family originates from Bosnia, from where they settled to Dalmatia and later in the Bay of Kotor.

Mandić grew up in the orbit of a community of Capuchin friars based in the Province of Venice who had served in his town for two centuries, dating from when the area was ruled by the Republic of Venice. Physically malformed and delicate, he grew to a height of only 1.35 m (4'5"), with a clumsy walk. He also had a stutter. Having felt called to follow that way of life, in November 1882, when he was 16, he went to Udine to enter the minor seminary of the Capuchin Venetian Province. Two years later he was admitted to the friars' novitiate in Bassano del Grappa, where he was clothed in the Capuchin habit and given the religious name of Leopold Maria. On 3 May 1885, he made his first profession of religious vows, after which he was sent to pursue his studies for Holy Orders in Capuchin friaries in Padua and Venice. He made his profession of perpetual vows in 1888.

Priesthood
On 20 September 1890, Mandić was ordained to the priesthood at the Basilica of Santa Maria della Salute in Venice at the age of 24 by Cardinal Domenico Agostini, Patriarch of Venice.

After his ordination, Mandić was sent to posts in various Capuchin friaries in the Venice region and in his native Croatia. Among his various tasks were the teaching of the seminarians who followed him, as well as the household duties of the house, such as porter. Common to all his assignments was that of the duty of a confessor at the church which the friars served. This went on until 1906, when he was assigned to the Friary of Santa Croce in Padua. It was there that he would spend the rest of his life.

Death
Mandić suffered from esophagus cancer, which would ultimately lead to his death at age 76. On 30 July 1942, while preparing for Mass, he collapsed on the floor. He was then brought to his cell, where he was given the last rites. Friars who had gathered at his bed began singing "Salve Regina" and saw that Leopold died as they sang "O clement, O loving, O sweet Virgin Mary".

Veneration
As a result of the bombing during World War II, the church and part of the friary in Padua where Mandić lived were demolished, but his cell and confessional were left unharmed. He had predicted this before his death, saying, "The church and the friary will be hit by the bombs, but not this little cell. Here God exercised so much mercy for people, it must remain as a monument to God's goodness." The Sanctuary of Leopold Mandić was built to contain the confessional. Pope Paul VI beatified Leopold on 2 May 1976. He was canonized by Pope John Paul II during the General Assembly of the Synod of Bishops on 16 October 1983. Leopold is hailed as the "Apostle of Unity".

Jubilee Year
At the personal request of Pope Francis, Mandić's remains were brought to Rome for veneration during the 2015–2016 Extraordinary Jubilee of Mercy. He and his fellow Capuchin friar, Pio of Pietrelcina, were designated as saint-confessors to inspire people to become reconciled to the Church and to God, by the confession of their sins. Their bodies were available for veneration, first at the Basilica of Saint Lawrence outside the Walls, administered by the Capuchin friars, then at St. Peter's Basilica.

References

External links

 The shrine and tomb of St Leopold Mandić – Padua, Italy (official website)
  Biografije svetaca Leopold Bogdan Mandić
 Short biography of St. Leopold Mandić 
  Zakučac proslavio blagdan sv. Leopolda Mandića: Zakučac celebrates the feast day of its saint
  Živi' će nam ime makar granu sikli  Reportaža  Glas Koncila Reportage of Glas koncila

1866 births
1942 deaths
People from Herceg Novi
Capuchins
19th-century Croatian Roman Catholic priests
Croatian Roman Catholic saints
Croatian expatriates in Italy
Montenegrin Roman Catholic priests
Croats of Montenegro
Deaths from esophageal cancer
Deaths from cancer in Veneto
Beatifications by Pope Paul VI
Canonizations by Pope John Paul II
19th-century Christian saints
20th-century Christian saints
Franciscan saints
Capuchin saints
20th-century Croatian Roman Catholic priests